The 1978–79 daytime network television schedule for the three major English-language commercial broadcast networks in the United States covers the weekday and weekend daytime hours from September 1978 to August 1979.

Legend

 New series are highlighted in bold.

Schedule
 All times correspond to U.S. Eastern and Pacific Time scheduling (except for some live sports or events). Except where affiliates slot certain programs outside their network-dictated timeslots, subtract one hour for Central, Mountain, Alaska, and Hawaii-Aleutian times.
 Local schedules may differ, as affiliates have the option to pre-empt or delay network programs. Such scheduling may be limited to preemptions caused by local or national breaking news or weather coverage (which may force stations to tape delay certain programs to other timeslots) and any major sports events scheduled to air in a weekday timeslot (mainly during major holidays). Stations may air shows at other times at their preference.

Monday–Friday

Notes:
 Programs aired before 9:00AM aired at the same time in all time zones. CBS's Sunrise Semester was a half-hour program which aired at either 6:00 or 6:30 AM, depending on the station.
 Programs scheduled after 10:00 AM Eastern aired one hour earlier (starting at 9:00 AM) in the Central and Pacific time zones. Stations in the Mountain time zone that started their network schedule at 8:00 AM would follow the Central and Pacific pattern that year.
 Some network programs, particularly before 7:00 AM and after 10:00/9:00 AM, were subject to preemption by local affiliate stations in favor of syndicated or locally produced programs.
 On ABC, World News Tonight was produced at 6:00 PM Eastern/5:00 PM Central, and aired live by some affiliates. This early feed of the broadcast was discontinued in 1982.
 NBC aired NBC News Updates at 10:57, 11:57, 12:57, 2:57 until June 1979, and 3:57.
 A CBS News Razzmatazz special would occasionally preempt CBS' 4:00PM show.

Saturday

In the News aired ten times during CBS' Saturday morning shows.

Sunday

By network

ABC

Returning Series
The $20,000 Pyramid
ABC World News Tonight
ABC Weekend Special
All My Children
American Bandstand
Animals, Animals, Animals
The Edge of Night
Family Feud
General Hospital
Good Morning America
Happy Days 
Issues and Answers
The All New Pink Panther Show (moved from NBC)
One Life to Live
Ryan's Hope
Schoolhouse Rock!
Scooby's All Stars 
Scooby-Doo, Where Are You!

New Series
ABC World News Sunday
Bigfoot and Wildboy
Challenge of the Super Friends
Fangface
Kids Are People Too
Laverne & Shirley 

Not Returning From 1977-78
ABC Evening News
The All-New Super Friends Hour
The Better Sex
The Great Grape Ape Show 
Jabberjaw 
The Krofft Supershow
Scooby's All-Star Laff-A-Lympics

CBS

Returning Series
All in the Family 
Ark II 
As the World Turns
The Bugs Bunny/Road Runner Hour
Camera Three
Captain Kangaroo
CBS Children's Film Festival
CBS Evening News
CBS Morning News
Clue Club 
Face the Nation
Fat Albert and the Cosby Kids
Guiding Light
Lamp Unto My Feet
Look Up and Live
Love of Life
Match Game
The Price Is Right
Search for Tomorrow
Space Academy 
Sunrise Semester
Tarzan, Lord of the JungleWhat's New, Mr. Magoo? 
The Young and the RestlessNew Series30 MinutesThe All New Popeye HourCBS News Sunday MorningM*A*S*H MorningTarzan and the Super 7Whew!Not Returning From 1977-78The Batman/Tarzan Adventure Hour
The Ghost Busters 
Here's Lucy 
The New Tic Tac Dough  
Pass the Buck
The Robonic Stooges
The Secrets of Isis 
The Skatebirds
Space Academy
Speed Buggy 
Tattletales 
Wacko

NBCReturning SeriesThe Alvin Show 
America Alive!
Another World
Baggy Pants and the Nitwits 
Card Sharks
The Daffy Duck Show
Days of Our Lives
The Doctors
High Rollers
The Hollywood Squares
Jeopardy!
The Jetsons 
Jonny Quest 
Meet the Press
NBC Nightly News
Today
Wheel of FortuneNew SeriesAll Star SecretsBuford and the Galloping GhostThe Daffy Duck ShowFabulous FunniesThe New Fantastic FourThe New Fred and Barney ShowGalaxy Goof-UpsThe Godzilla Power HourThe Krofft Superstar HourJana of the JungleThe Metric MarvelsMindreadersPassword PlusYogi's Space RaceNot Returning From 1977-78'CB BearsChico and the Man For Richer, For PoorerThe Gong ShowI Am the Greatest: The Adventures of Muhammad AliKnockoutNBC Saturday Night NewsNBC Sunday Night NewsThe New Archie and Sabrina HourThink Pink Panther (moved to ABC)The Red Hand GangSanford and Son Search and Rescue: The Alpha TeamSpace SentinelsThunderTo Say the Least''

See also
1978-79 United States network television schedule (prime-time)
1978-79 United States network television schedule (late night)

Sources
https://web.archive.org/web/20071015122215/http://curtalliaume.com/abc_day.html
https://web.archive.org/web/20071015122235/http://curtalliaume.com/cbs_day.html
https://web.archive.org/web/20071012211242/http://curtalliaume.com/nbc_day.html

United States weekday network television schedules
1978 in American television
1979 in American television